Melanonaclia lugens is a moth of the  subfamily Arctiinae. It was described by Oberthür, 1893. It is found in Madagascar.

References

 Natural History Museum Lepidoptera generic names catalog

Arctiinae
Moths described in 1893